The CVT M-300 was a single-seat glider designed and built in Italy from 1967.

Development 
Designed by Alberto Morelli, this single-seat high-performance standard class glider was intended for competition flying, record breaking and club use. Advanced constructional techniques used for the plywood skinned, aluminium alloy sparred, M-300 wings ensured accurate surfaces with high-quality surface finish. The fuselage was conventionally built using wooden frames, plywood skinning with a glass-fibre nose cone, and integral swept fin which supported the narrow chord all-flying tailplane. Two prototypes were built with the first flight taking place in April 1968.

Specifications

See also

References

 Coates, Andrew. “Jane's World Sailplanes & Motor Gliders new edition”. London, Jane's. 1980. 
 Taylor, J. H. (ed) (1989) Jane's Encyclopedia of Aviation. Studio Editions: London. p. 29

External links
 https://web.archive.org/web/20070608195616/http://www.sailplanedirectory.com/PlaneDetails.cfm?planeID=459

Glider aircraft